Ninokura Dam is an asphalt dam located in Aomori Prefecture in Japan. The dam is used for flood control. The catchment area of the dam is 21.5 km2. The dam impounds about 20  ha of land when full and can store 2810 thousand cubic meters of water. The construction of the dam was started on 1967 and completed in 1970.

References

Dams in Aomori Prefecture
1970 establishments in Japan